is a theme park in Kinugawa Onsen, Nikkō, Tochigi, Japan. The theme park contains over a hundred 1:25 scale models of famous buildings, including UNESCO-designated World Cultural and Heritage Sites, complete with 140,000 1:25 miniature people.

On 24 April 2010, a 1:25 scale model of the Tokyo Skytree was unveiled at the park. This is 26 metres tall, taller than the 19.95-metre replica of the New York World Trade Center.

Night time illumination 
Between November and March the park has extended opening hours. During this time approximately 1.4 million red and blue lights illuminate the park. Buildings such as the Tokyo Sky Tree, the Eiffel Tower and the Duomo di Milano are lit up with LEDs and spotlights. There is also a 150-meter tunnel of lights that leads up to the Alpine Roses Park.

List of exhibits 
Bold Exhibits are UNESCO Cultural heritage sites.

Modern Japan zone

America Zone

Egypt Zone

Europe zone

Asia zone

Japan Zone

References

External links

 Official Tobu World Square site

Tourist attractions in Tochigi Prefecture
Miniature parks
Buildings and structures in Tochigi Prefecture